Muhammad Nasser, and other variants using "Al-", "Abu-", or "bin", may refer to:

Academics 
 Mohammed Abu Naser (1921–2004), Bangladeshi academic
 Mohammad Jibran Nasir (born 1987), Pakistani civil rights activist and lawyer
 Mohamed Nasser Kotby (born 1937), Egyptian professor

Politicians 
 Mohamad Nasir (born 1960), Indonesian politician and professor
 Mohamed Nasir (1916–1997), Malaysian politician
 Mohammad Nasser Saghaye-Biria (born 1958), Iranian imam and politician
 Mohd Nasir Hashim (born 1947), Malaysian politician
 Mohammed Nasser Al-Sanousi (born 1938), Kuwaiti politician

Sportspeople 
 Muhammad Nasir (born 1937), Pakistani boxer
 Mohammed Nasser (born 1988), Emirati footballer
 Mohamed El-Naser, Libyan swimmer
 Mohamed Nasir Abbas (born 1996), Qatari athlete
 Mohammad Nasser Afash (born 1966), Syrian footballer
 Mohamed Naser Elsayed Elneny (born 1992), Egyptian footballer
 Mohamad Naser Al-Sayed (born 1981), Qatari chess player
 Mohammed Nasser Shakroun (born 1984), Iraqi footballer

Other people 

 Muhammad Nasiruddin Nasir (born 1997), Malaysian actor
 Mohammed Nasser Al Ahbabi, Emirati engineer and space administrator
 Mohammed Nasser Ahmed (born 1950), Yemeni major general
 Mohammed bin Nasser Al-Ajmi, Kuwaiti writer
 Muhammad bin Nasir (died 1728), Omani imam

See also 
 Abdelkarim Hussein Mohamed Al-Nasser, Saudi Arabian terrorist
 Hala Mohammad al-Nasser (born 1964), Minister of Housing and Construction for Syria
 Nafih Mohammed Naser, Indian education activist
 Mohamed Eid Naser Al-Bishi (born 1987), Saudi Arabian footballer
 Turki bin Mohammed bin Nasser bin Abdulaziz Al Saud (born 1969), Saudi Arabian prince
 Nasser Muhammad (disambiguation)
 Muhammad (name)
 Nasser (name)